The 2005 Boys' Youth European Volleyball Championship was the 6th edition of the Boys' Youth European Volleyball Championship, organised by Europe's governing volleyball body, the CEV. It was held in Riga, Latvia from March 29 to April 3, 2005.

Poland won their 1st title in the tournament by defeating France. Jakub Jarosz was elected the Most Valuable Player.

Participating teams
 Host
 
 Qualified through 2005 Boys' Youth European Volleyball Championship Qualification

Pool composition

Pool standing procedure
 Match points
 Numbers of matches won
 Sets ratio
 Points ratio
 Result of the last match between the tied teams

Match won 3–0 or 3–1: 3 match points for the winner, 0 match points for the loser
Match won 3–2: 2 match points for the winner, 1 match point for the loser

Squads

Preliminary round
All times are Eastern European Time (UTC+03:00)

Pool A

|}

|}

Pool B

|}

|}

Pool C

|}

|}

Pool D

|}

|}

Final round
All times are Eastern European Time (UTC+03:00)

Quarterfinals

|}

9th to 12th place

9th–12th place playoff

|}

11th place

|}

9th place

|}

5th to 8th place

5th–8th place playoff

|}

7th place

|}

5th place

|}

Final round

Semifinal

|}

3rd place

|}

Final

|}

Final standing

Individual awards

Most Valuable Player
 Jakub Jarosz
Best Spiker
 Bartosz Kurek
Best Blocker
 Michele Parusso
Best Server
 Emmanuel Ragondet
Best Setter
 Davide Saitta
Best Receiver
 Raphaël Mrozek
Best Libero
 Adrian Stańczak

References

External links

European Boys' Youth Championship
Volleyball
Boys' Youth European Volleyball Championship
International volleyball competitions hosted by Latvia